Tough Love is a 2015 German semi-documentary drama film directed by Rosa von Praunheim and starring Hanno Koffler, Luise Heyer and Katy Karrenbauer. For example, the film was screened at the 2015 Montreal World Film Festival and at the Hong Kong International Film Festival in the same year.

Plot
Andreas (Hanno Koffler) was physically abused by his father from an early age and sexually abused by his mother (Katy Karrenbauer) for years. Traumatized by these experiences of violence and rape, he slipped into crime as a young man and earned his money as a brutal pimp. But the police noticed him. After an outbreak of violence, Andreas ends up in prison, where he manages to come to terms with his past over the years, also with the help of his faithful girlfriend Marion (Luise Heyer). From then on he did everything he could to get out of crime and the prostitution scene. Later he takes action against what he had to go through himself: the physical, sexual and psychological abuse of children.

Awards
 2015: Katy Karrenbauer was honored for her acting performance with the special prize of the German Film Academy "Jaeger-LeCoultre Homage to German Film"
 2015: Hanno Koffler was nominated for the German Film Award as best male leading actor
 2015: Nomination for the Gold Hugo at the Chicago International Film Festival
 2015: Third place in the Panorama Audience Award of the Berlin International Film Festival

Reception
The culture magazine Kunst+Film wrote that the title would do the film credit: "Like its protagonist, it portrays the dazzling life of its protagonist harshly and relentlessly." The minimalist setting of the film was praised as a successful stylistic device, this "restriction to the essentials characterizes intense atmospheric density [...]. In addition, Praunheim has found wonderful actors. Katy Karrenbauer as a mother shows great courage to face unsympathetic ugliness with full, even naked, physical exertion. Hanno Koffler as young Andreas is just as convincing as Luise Heyer as his long-term girlfriend Marion."

References

External links
 

2015 films
2015 drama films
2010s German-language films
German drama films
Films directed by Rosa von Praunheim
2010s German films